K32NM-D, virtual channel 41 (UHF digital channel 32), is a low-powered HSN-affiliated television station licensed to Des Moines, Iowa, United States. The station is owned by Ventana Television.

History 
The station’s construction permit was issued on September 27, 1990 under the calls of K41DD. It changed to K41DD-D on January 3, 2011, and then to the current K32NM-D on September 20, 2019.

Digital channels
The station's signal is multiplexed:

References

External links

 Dabl affiliates
Low-power television stations in the United States
Television stations in Iowa
Television channels and stations established in 1990
1990 establishments in Iowa